"Hot Potato" is a song by American singer La Toya Jackson, the third single from her third studio album Heart Don't Lie (1984). It peaked at #43 on the Billboard Black Singles chart and at #38 on the Billboard Hot Dance Music/Club Play chart. It also enjoyed time on the Billboard Heatseekers chart. It also peaked at #92 in the United Kingdom. The single was released on 7" and 12" formats with the album track "Think Twice" as the B-side. Some singles also include a dub version.

Performances 
Jackson performed the song on "Solid Gold" which was broadcast on September 8, 1984. She also performed it on the U.S. TV show "The Fall Guy" broadcast on February 13, 1984, in the episode "Rock-A-Bye Baby".

Versions
 Album version – 4:41
 7" version – 3:51
 12" version – 6:27
 Dub version – 5:59
 TV mix – 6:30

References

1984 singles
La Toya Jackson songs
1984 songs
Epic Records singles
Songs written by La Toya Jackson
Songs written by Amir Bayyan